Erigeron himalajensis is an Asian species of flowering plants in the family Asteraceae. It grows on stony slopes and the margins of forests in the mountains of Afghanistan, Tibet, Sichuan, and Yunnan.

Erigeron himalajensis is a perennial, clump-forming herb up to 60 cm (5 feet) tall, forming woody rhizomes. Its flower heads have pink or purple ray florets surrounding yellow disc florets.

References

himalajensis
Flora of Asia
Plants described in 1906